Claude Bessy may refer to:

 Claude Bessy (dancer) (born 1932), Paris Opera Ballet and director of same school
 Claude Bessy (writer) (1945–1999), French writer and Los Angeles punk singer